Chogawan is a village in Bhulath tehsil in the Kapurthala district of Punjab State, India. The village is administered by a sarpanch who is an elected representative of the village in accordance with the constitution of India and the Panchayati raj.

List of cities near the village 
Bhulath
Kapurthala
Phagwara 
Sultanpur Lodhi

Air travel connectivity 
The closest international airport to the village is Sri Guru Ram Dass Jee International Airport.

References

External links
 Villages in Kapurthala
 List of Villages in Kapurthala Tehsil

Villages in Kapurthala district